Lucky Fugitives is a 1936 Canadian drama film directed by Nick Grinde and starring David Manners, Maxine Doyle and Reginald Hincks.

Cast
 David Manners as Jack Wycoff / Cy King 
 Maxine Doyle as Aline McLain 
 Reginald Hincks as Donald McLain 
 James McGrath as Sheriff 
 Garland B. Davidson as Moriarity 
 Arthur Legge-Willis as Chief of Police 
 Doreen Wilson as Molly King 
 Fred Bass as Kelly 
 Pat Carlyle as Prince Alexis Gregory Timenoff

References

Bibliography
  Oeter Morris. Embattled Shadows: A History of Canadian Cinema, 1895-1939. McGill-Queen's Press, 1992.

External links
 

1936 films
1936 drama films
1930s English-language films
Canadian drama films
English-language Canadian films
Films directed by Nick Grinde
Canadian black-and-white films
1930s Canadian films